The Pur is a river in the Yamalo-Nenets Autonomous Okrug, Russia. It has a length of  — counting the length of the Pyakupur at its head.

The Urengoy gas field and Gubkin gas and oil field are located in the basin of the Pur.

Course
The Pur is formed at the confluence of the Pyakupur and Ayvasedapur rivers, which have their sources in the northern slopes of the Siberian Uvaly. It flows roughly northwards across the northern  West Siberian Plain, meandering strongly. In its lower course its channel divided into branches. Purovsky District is named after the river.
Just a few miles west of the mouth of the Taz, the Pur flows into the Taz Estuary, which is connected through the Gulf of Ob with the Kara Sea. The river freezes up in November and stays icebound until May.

See also
List of rivers of Russia

References

External links
 Gas production